The first USS Triana was a screw steamer in commission as a tug in the United States Navy from at least 1867 until she was wrecked in 1891.

The first U.S. Navy ship of the name, she probably was named for Rodrigo de Triana, the lookout aboard Pinta, who first sighted land on 12 October 1492 during Christopher Columbus′s first voyage to the New World, although no documentary evidence has been found linking her name to Triana.

Construction

Triana was constructed by William Perrine at New York City and launched in 1865. She apparently was completed sometime after January 1866.

Service history
After her delivery to the U.S. Navy, Triana was laid up at the Washington Navy Yard in Washington, D.C. Either during or before the summer of 1867, she began active service at the Washington Navy Yard. In 1880, she was transferred to the New York Navy Yard in Brooklyn, New York, where she operated until 1887. She then was transferred again, this time to the Naval Torpedo Station at Newport, Rhode Island, where she performed "special service" duty in support of U.S. Navy experimental torpedo work and served as an accommodation ship for U.S. Navy personnel under instruction at Naval Station Newport.

Ordered to proceed to the scene and assist in salvaging the two ships, Triana was wrecked on 15 March 1891 off the coast of Massachusetts on a sandbar off the east end of Cuttyhunk Island because of a navigational error by her crew.

Triana was struck from the Navy list on 13 April 1891. Her wreck was sold on 2 May 1891.

See also

Notes

References 

wreckhunter.net Hunting New England Shipwrecks USS Triana Accessed 5 February 2021

Tugs of the United States Navy
Ships built in New York City
1865 ships
Shipwrecks of the Massachusetts coast
Shipwrecks in the Atlantic Ocean
Maritime incidents in 1891